O'Moore Park is a GAA stadium in Portlaoise, County Laois, Ireland. It is the home of the Laois Gaelic football and hurling teams. Under a new sponsorship deal it is known as "Laois Hire O'Moore Park".

Although it may have been in use as a GAA ground since 1888, and was acquired by Maryborough GAA Club in 1908, it was not purchased as the county grounds until 1917, becoming then one of the first grounds acquired by a county board (just six years after the purchase of Croke Park). 

The ground has a capacity of about 22,000, of which 6,500 is seated. Its pitch is one of Ireland's best under weather. It is the venue for many club and county matches, particularly since the installation of floodlights. It is frequently used as a neutral stadium for inter-county matches not involving Laois. It is located 0.5 km from Portlaoise town centre on the N80 road (Abbeyleix road). 

In the stand white seats against a background of blue seats are used to spell out "Laois Laois".

See also
 List of Gaelic Athletic Association stadiums
 List of stadiums in Ireland

References

Buildings and structures in Portlaoise
Gaelic games grounds in the Republic of Ireland
Laois GAA
Sport in Portlaoise
Sports venues in County Laois